Zlatno is a village and municipality in Zlaté Moravce District of the Nitra Region, in western-central Slovakia. Total municipality population was 223 inhabitants in 2011.

Notable personalities 
 Emil Benčík, Slovak writer and journalist
 Michal Lukniš, Slovak geographer and university teacher
 Michal Zaťko, Slovak hydrographer and university teacher

References

External links
Official homepage

Villages and municipalities in Zlaté Moravce District